A by-election to the States of Jersey was held on 7 September 2016.

Background
Senator Zoe Cameron resigned from the States of Jersey on 12 July 2016, triggering a by-election.

Results

St Helier No. 1

References

External links
States of Jersey elections

By 2016
2016 in Jersey
2016 elections in Europe